Akure Airport  is an airport serving Akure, the capital of Ondo State, Nigeria.

The Akure non-directional beacon (Ident: AK) is located on the field.

Airlines and destinations

See also

Transport in Nigeria
List of airports in Nigeria

References

External links
 
OurAirports - Akure
SkyVector Aeronautical Charts
OpenStreetMap - Akure

Airports in Nigeria
Ondo State
Airports in Yorubaland